The 2010 Hastings Borough Council elections were held on 6 May 2010, with half of the council's seats up for election. The Labour Party regained control of the council from no overall control, despite suffering a heavy defeat in the nationwide general election that was held on the same day. Overall turnout was 61.9%. The election in Ore ward was delayed due to the death of the Conservative candidate following the close of nominations.

After the election, the composition of the council was:
Labour 17
Conservative 14
Liberal Democrat 1

Election result

Ward results

References

BBC News Election 2010 - Hastings
Ward results
Local Elections Archive Project - 2010 - Hastings

2010
2010 English local elections
May 2010 events in the United Kingdom
2010s in East Sussex